The 1978 Kilkenny Senior Hurling Championship was the 84th staging of the Kilkenny Senior Hurling Championship since its establishment by the Kilkenny County Board.

Fenians were the defending champions.

On 22 October 1978, Ballyhale Shamrocks won the championship after a 0-15 to 0-10 defeat of Fenians in the final. It was their first ever championship title.

Results

Group 1

Group 1 table

Group 1 results

Group 2 table

Group 2

Group 2 results

Semi-finals

Final

Championship statistics

Miscellaneous

 The first-round match between Erin's Own and Bennettsbridge saw 15-year-old Richard McCarthy make his championship debut for the latter team when he was introduced as a substitute for goalkeeper Noel Skehan.
 The semi-final between James Stephens and Fenians was abandoned after 49 minutes after a pitch invasion by supporters.

References

Kilkenny Senior Hurling Championship
Kilkenny Senior Hurling Championship